Andreas Faehlmann (27 June 1898 – 10 April 1943) was an Estonian aviation engineer and sailor who competed in the 1928 Summer Olympics. He was born in Vladivostok, Russian Empire, and died in Bremen, Germany. In 1928 he was a crew member of the Estonian boat Tutti V, which won the bronze medal in the 6 metre class. His older brother Georg was also a crew member. His great grand uncle was the notable Estonian philologist and physician Friedrich Robert Faehlmann.

References

External links
 
 
 
 

1898 births
1943 deaths
Estonian male sailors (sport)
Olympic sailors of Estonia
Olympic bronze medalists for Estonia
Olympic medalists in sailing
Sailors at the 1928 Summer Olympics – 6 Metre
Medalists at the 1928 Summer Olympics
Sportspeople from Vladivostok